Louis Ludik (born 8 October 1986) is a South African rugby union player who played for Ulster Rugby at full-back. Ludik played over 70 times in Super Rugby before moving to Agen in France in 2013. After one season with the French club he signed a 2-year deal with Ulster in May 2014.

He announced his retirement on 27 May 2021.

References

 Sharks Rugby
 Agen Rugby

External links

itsrugby.co.uk Profile

Living people
1986 births
Afrikaner people
South African rugby union players
Golden Lions players
Lions (United Rugby Championship) players
Sharks (Currie Cup) players
Sharks (rugby union) players
People from Kempton Park, Gauteng
Rugby union fullbacks
Rugby union players from Gauteng
Ulster Rugby players
South African expatriate rugby union players
South African expatriate sportspeople in France
South African expatriate sportspeople in Northern Ireland
Expatriate rugby union players in Northern Ireland
Expatriate rugby union players in France